The 2016 UEFA Women's Olympic Qualifying Tournament was an international football competition organised by UEFA to determine the final women's national team from Europe to qualify for the 2016 Summer Olympics women's football tournament in Brazil. The tournament was played between 2 and 9 March 2016 in the Netherlands.

Four teams participated in the tournament: Netherlands, Norway, Sweden and Switzerland. As the tournament winner, Sweden qualified for the last available Olympic spot from Europe, joining France and Germany, who had already qualified, as the three UEFA representatives.

Background
Same as the qualification process for previous Olympics, UEFA used the FIFA Women's World Cup to determine which women's national teams from Europe qualify for the Olympic football tournament. The three teams from UEFA that progressed the furthest in the 2015 FIFA Women's World Cup played in Canada, other than ineligible England, would qualify for the 2016 Summer Olympics women's football tournament in Brazil. If teams in contention for the Olympic spots were eliminated in the same round, ties were not broken by their overall tournament record, and play-offs or a mini-tournament to decide the spots would be held provisionally in February/March 2016.

England were ineligible for the Olympics as they were not an Olympic nation, although Great Britain did compete in 2012 as the host nation. The Football Association had originally declared on 2 March 2015 its intention to enter and run teams on behalf of the British Olympic Association at the 2016 Olympics should England qualify. Following strong objections from the Scottish, Welsh and Northern Irish football associations, and a commitment from FIFA that they would not allow entry of a British team unless all four Home Nations agreed, the Football Association announced on 30 March 2015 that they would not seek entry into the Olympic tournament.

After Norway were eliminated by England in the round of 16 on 22 June 2015, it was confirmed that two of the three spots would go to quarter-finalists France and Germany because there could not be more than three eligible European teams in the quarter-finals. Eventually no other eligible European team reached the quarter-finals, so the four European teams eliminated in the round of 16 (Netherlands, Norway, Sweden and Switzerland) would compete in the UEFA play-off tournament to decide the last spot.

The last time a play-off was necessary to decide a European spot in the Olympic women's football tournament was when Sweden defeated Denmark over two legs to claim a place in the 2008 Olympics. Same as this time, had England been eligible to enter, they would have qualified as one of the top three UEFA teams in the 2007 FIFA Women's World Cup, rendering the play-off unnecessary.

Teams
Among the four teams, only Norway and Sweden had previously played in the Olympics. Norway had played in three Olympics, and were the only European gold medalists so far, winning in 2000, and also taking bronze in 1996. Sweden had played in all five Olympics so far, but never won a medal, with their best finish being fourth in 2004.

Format
UEFA confirmed on 24 June 2015 to the Norwegian newspaper Dagbladet that the four teams would meet each other once, making it a mini-tournament with six matches altogether. With three points for a win and one for a draw, the top team after the six matches would qualify for the Olympics. The period reserved for this playoff tournament was the FIFA women's international match date from 29 February to 9 March 2016. The four teams concerned would need to agree on the exact dates within this window. The tournament would be arranged in one of the four countries involved.

On 22 July 2015 UEFA announced that the Netherlands would host the mini-tournament, with matches taking place between 2 and 9 March 2016.

Venues

Rotterdam and The Hague were confirmed as host cities by the Royal Dutch Football Association (KNVB) on 19 October 2015.

Standings

Matches
All times CET (UTC+1).

Goalscorers
2 goals

 Manon Melis
 Vivianne Miedema
 Ada Hegerberg
 Rahel Kiwic

1 goal

 Mandy van den Berg
 Shanice van de Sanden
 Emilie Haavi
 Caroline Graham Hansen
 Maren Mjelde
 Lisa Dahlkvist
 Olivia Schough
 Caroline Seger
 Ramona Bachmann
 Fabienne Humm
 Sandrine Mauron

Qualified teams for Olympics
After the conclusion of the qualifying tournament, the following three teams from UEFA qualified for the Olympic football tournament.

1 Bold indicates champion for that year. Italic indicates host for that year.

References

Women's Olympic Qualifying Tournament
2016 in women's association football
Uefa
March 2016 sports events in Europe
2016 Uefa Women's Olympic Qualifying Tournament
2015–16 in Dutch football
2016 in Norwegian football
2016 in Swedish football
2015–16 in Swiss football
Olympic qualifying